Zanthojoppa is a genus of parasitoid wasps belonging to the family Ichneumonidae.

The species of this genus are found in Europe.

Species:
 Zanthojoppa lutea (Gravenhorst, 1829) 
 Zanthojoppa popae Heinrich, 1975

References

Ichneumonidae
Ichneumonidae genera